Whedonverse is a collection of American comic books published by Boom! Studios and based on television series created by Joss Whedon.

List of titles

Ongoing series

Limited series

One-shot issues

Graphic novels

See also 

List of Buffyverse comics
Buffy the Vampire Slayer comics
List of Angel comics
Serenity (comics)

References

2018 comics debuts
Boom! Studios titles
Angel (1999 TV series)
Buffy the Vampire Slayer
Firefly (franchise)
Comic book reboots